Hoseyn Beygi is a village in Khuzestan Province, Iran.

Hoseyn Beygi may also refer to:

 Hoseynabad-e Khayyat
 Shah Reza, Lorestan